The 2015 Premier League season was the second division of British speedway.

Summary
took place between March and October 2015. The Edinburgh Monarchs were the defending champions after winning the championship in 2014. The 13 teams that competed remained unchanged from the teams who competed in 2014. There had been concerns about whether or not the Peterborough Panthers would be able to compete but their future was secured after being able to raise the money necessary to continue racing.

In an all-Scottish final, the Edinburgh Monarchs became the first team to win consecutive Premier League titles, by beating the Glasgow Tigers in the Grand Final. The Tigers held a 7-point lead after the first leg at Ashfield, but the Monarchs won 14 of the 15 heats in the second leg at Armadale – winning 58–32 on the night – to win the tie overall 99–80. It was one of three titles won by the Monarchs in 2015; in the Premier League Cup, the Monarchs beat the Tigers once again 100–79, while the quartet of Craig Cook, Sam Masters, Erik Riss and Justin Sedgmen won the Premier League Fours.

Aside from Edinburgh's successes, the Somerset Rebels defeated the Monarchs to win the Knockout Cup, Daniel King and Rohan Tungate won the Premier League Pairs for the Ipswich Witches, and Danish rider Ulrich Østergaard won the Premier League Riders' Championship for the Peterborough Panthers.

Final league table

Play-offs

Draw

Quarter-finals

Semi-finals

Grand final
First leg

Second leg

Premier League Knockout Cup
The 2015 Premier League Knockout Cup was the 48th edition of the Knockout Cup for tier two teams. Somerset Rebels were the winners of the competition.

First round

Quarter-finals

Semi-finals

Final
First leg

Second leg

Edinburgh were declared Knockout Cup Champions, winning on aggregate 92–88.

Final leading averages

Riders & final averages
Berwick Bandits

 8.54
 7.94

 7.57

Edinburgh Monarchs

 10.35
 8.98
 8.18
 7.84
 5.22
 3.48
 3.40

Glasgow Tigers

 9.12
 8.37
 7.91

 5.28

 5.00

Ipswich Witches

 9.54
 7.74
 7.55
 5.87
 5.43
 4.74

Newcastle Diamonds

 8.08
 7.05
 7.03

 5.14
 4.97
 4.38

Peterborough Panthers

 7.87

 5.96
 5.19Plymouth Devils 7.52
 7.10
 6.86
 6.84

 5.38Redcar Bears 8.30
 7.13

 6.50 

 3.83
 2.71Rye House Rockets 9.57

 6.91

 5.74Scunthorpe Scorpions 6.53
 6.26

 5.33

 4.50

 
 2.08Sheffield Tigers 5.58 Somerset Rebels 8.73
 8.50
 6.89
 6.84
 6.00Workington Comets'''

 8.86
 7.42
 6.98
 6.84
 5.48
 4.96
 3.01
 1.97
 1.29

See also
List of United Kingdom Speedway League Champions
Knockout Cup (speedway)

Notes

References

Speedway Premier League
Premier
Speedway Premier League